Leo M. Davidoff (January 16, 1898 – December 25, 1975) was a professor, associate dean and chairman of the departments of surgery and neurological surgery at the Albert Einstein College of Medicine in New York City.  He earned his MD from Harvard Medical School.

Honours and awards

Foreign honours
 : Officer of the Order of the White Lion (1946)

References

1975 deaths
Yeshiva University faculty
Albert Einstein College of Medicine faculty
1898 births
Officers of the Order of the White Lion
Harvard Medical School alumni